Royal Oak is a station of the London Underground, on the Hammersmith & City and Circle lines, between  and  stations. The station is on Lord Hill's Bridge and is in Travelcard Zone 2 for the London Underground. Although not heavily used at other times, the station is extremely busy during the annual Notting Hill Carnival. There is no wheelchair access to the platform. It is classed as a "local station" in Transport for London's "Fit for the Future" development outline.

The station opened on 30 October 1871, although the Metropolitan Railway extension to Hammersmith had opened in 1864. It is close to the elevated Westway section of the A40 road.  The station is named after a nearby public house, "The Royal Oak" (later "The Railway Tap" and now "The Porchester"). There was a small newsagents kiosk next to the ticket office from the 1950s to 1986, when it was closed to make room for ticketing machines needed for the Underground Ticketing System (UTS).

History

The station

An agreement between the GWR and the Metropolitan Railway (who had co-owned the Hammersmith & City with the GWR since 1867) came into force on 1 July 1868, although it did not become legal until the following year. Under the agreement, various improvements were to be made; these included the provision of a station at Royal Oak, and the reconstruction of Westbourne Park. On 30 October 1871 the station at Royal Oak opened,  out; it was situated between Ranelagh Bridge and Lord Hills Bridge, and access was from the latter. As originally built, it had three platform faces; one for down trains and two, each side of an island, for up trains. It was served by both main line and Hammersmith & City trains, and, for over sixty years, this was the first stop out of Paddington for main line trains; it remains the first stop for Hammersmith & City services. The station was hit during the 1940-41 blitz, with track, the platform and a nearby main-line train taking bomb damage.

During the quadrupling of the Great Western Main Line (GWML) in 1878, a dive-under, known as Subway Tunnel, was constructed between Royal Oak and Westbourne Park. This was for Hammersmith & City services, allowing them to cross the main line without interfering with the flow of traffic; it was brought into use on 12 May 1878. To accommodate the additional track of the main line, it was necessary to reduce Royal Oak station to two platform faces; the former down platform was removed (its track becoming the up main), and the southern of the two former up platforms became the down platform.

Trains along the GWML ceased to call at Royal Oak from 1 October 1934, but the Hammersmith & City service remained. Ownership of the station was not transferred to London Transport until 1 January 1970. The first GWML stop out of Paddington is now .

Ranelagh Bridge depot
There had been a locomotive depot at Westbourne Park since 1855, which was replaced by the Old Oak Common depot in 1906. To avoid the need for locomotives to make the  round trip from Paddington just to be turned, coaled and watered, a small maintenance facility for locomotives was constructed on the southern side of the line, directly opposite Royal Oak station, which occupied part of the site of Westbourne Lodge and its grounds. It was known as Ranelagh Bridge depot, and opened in 1907. There was a turntable, a water tower, a coaling stage and sidings where about 15 locomotives could be held awaiting their next trip west. The turntable was removed in April 1964, and the depot facilities were altered to suit Diesel locomotives; the depot closed in 1980.

Coach station proposal

At the end of 2018 residents became aware that Royal Oak was under consideration as a possible location for a new coach station to replace Victoria Coach Station, to be built on land north of the station (previously used for soil handling machinery used in construction of the nearby Crossrail tunnels). This was strongly opposed by Westminster's main political parties, given the limited capacity of Royal Oak tube station and other local transport links, and the predominantly residential nature of the area. No firm details were published by Transport for London, but opponents of the scheme claimed that Royal Oak was the preferred site, that the scheme would occupy a 10,000 sq m site stretching from Lord's Hill Bridge (Royal Oak) to Westbourne Terrace, that a road bridge crossing the area would be closed and removed, and (in letters sent to local residents) that the tube station would have to be closed for an extended period while construction was in progress, since the coach station proposal included step-free access to the platform. On 13 March 2019 the Mayor of London informed local groups that use of the site had been considered but it was not a viable site for this purpose and TfL would not take their plans forward. The Mayor has subsequently told the London Assembly that the area of land may instead be used for other purposes such as sustainable housing and improvements to accessibility at the station.

In popular culture

The station appears in the 2006 film Kidulthood.
Lord Hills Bridge is mentioned in the song "Nature Springs" on the album The Good, the Bad & the Queen.
Royal Oak is mentioned in Peter Ackroyd's 1987 novel Chatterton (Part I, Chapter 4)

Connections
London Buses routes 18 and 36 and night bus route N18 serve the station.

Gallery

Notes and references

Notes

References

External links

 
 

Circle line (London Underground) stations
Hammersmith & City line stations
Tube stations in the City of Westminster
Former Great Western Railway stations
Great Western Main Line
Railway stations in Great Britain opened in 1871